Frederic Curzon (4 September 18996 December 1973) was an English composer, conductor and musician.

He was born in London in 1899, and died at Bournemouth in 1973.  Curzon had a life largely associated with music - besides composing, he conducted and was both a pianist and a noted organist. His early life was largely in the theatre, where he was musical director in several London West End theatres. He was the organist at Shepherds Bush Pavilion for many years and from 1939 and throughout the war conducted at Llandudno Pier. In 1938, he moved to the radio. The music he wrote was mainly of the English light music genre, but he also wrote for films, radio and the theatre. Curzon worked as Head of Light Music at publishers Boosey and Hawkes.

Light music 
  The Boulevardier
 Overture Chevalier
  Overture Punchinello
 Overture Vanguard
  Saltarello
  Robin Hood Suite (includes "Maid Marion" and "March of the Bowmen")
 Spanish Suite In Malaga
 Salon Suite
  Charm of Youth Suite
  Dance of the Ostracised Imp (for years, this has been the theme music for the radio series of Paulus the woodgnome, created by Jean Dulieu)
  Cascade Waltz
  Capricante
  Galavant
  Simonetta
  Bravada (Paro Doble)
  Saltarello for piano and orchestra (published 1952)
 Pastoral Scene (1938)

Fanfares 

 Fanfare No. 4 
 Fanfare No. 5 "For a Merry Occasion"
 ''Fanfare No. 6 "Westminster"

References 
Notes

Sources
 
 
 
 Scowcroft, Philip L. Frederick Curzon.

1899 births
1973 deaths
20th-century classical composers
20th-century British conductors (music)
20th-century British male musicians
20th-century English composers
British male conductors (music)
English classical composers
English male classical composers
English conductors (music)
Light music composers